is a Japanese idol, singer and actor. He is most well known as the eldest member of the Johnny's boy band Kis-My-Ft2. Kitayama has also appeared in many television drama series such as Kazoku Gari (as Suzuki Keitoku) and in musicals such as Let's Sing A Song Of Love (celebrating 40 years of Kansai TV).

History
Hiromitsu Kitayama attended Horikoshi High School and graduated from Asia University in 2008. He entered Johnny's in 2002 and debuted in 2011 as member of Kis-My-Ft2.

Dramas and TV shows 
Misaki Number One!! (NTV / 2011) – Minato Ryosuke
Beginners! | Biginazu! (TBS / 2012) – Tachibana Danji
Kasuka na Kanojo (Fuji TV / 2013) – Hayashi Kunihiko
2013-Saibanchou! Onaka ga sukimashita! – Nita Seigi
Kazoku Gari (TBS / 2014) – Suzuki Keitoku

Solo TV shows
 2012.7 – J's Journey-Solo Back Pack Trip Across India
 2013.4 – 10000 Yen Per Month Challenge

Radio
 October 14, 2013~Present Nanikita (Nanikin)

Film
 Tiger: My Life as a Cat  (2019), Suzuo "Tora-san" Takahata

Discography (Solos)
 Sanagi (Kis-My-1st)
 Rock U (Good Ikuze!)
 Give Me... (Good Ikuze!)
 FORM (Kis-My-Journey)

References

 Hiromitsu Kitayama

1985 births
Living people
Japanese idols
Japanese male pop singers
Japanese male actors
Horikoshi High School alumni
Asia University (Japan) alumni
21st-century Japanese singers
21st-century Japanese male singers